"Sing a Song" is a song written and recorded by Christian rock band Third Day. It was released as a single from their 2003 album Offerings II: All I Have to Give

Charts

References

2003 songs
2003 singles
Third Day songs
Sparrow Records singles